Clubiona riparia, the riparian sac spider, is a species of sac spider in the family Clubionidae. It is found in Russia, Mongolia, China, Japan, and North America.

References

Clubionidae
Articles created by Qbugbot
Spiders described in 1866